German invasion of Belgium may refer to:

German invasion of Belgium (1914) during World War I
German invasion of Belgium (1940) during World War II